Asantha R. Cooray is a professor and a chancellor's fellow at University of California, Irvine, California, US, and a member of the research faculty at the California Institute of Technology. His research expertise is in the field of space science, cosmology, astrophysics and is a member of several space-based and NASA sounding rocket experiments and instrumentation aimed at understanding the early universe, first stars, and galaxies. He is a member of the ESA's Herschel Space Observatory-SPIRE Instrument Team and several NASA astrophysics missions planned for this decade, including the Inflation Probe. He has contributed to topics in field such as halo model of the galaxy distribution in the large-scale structure, and has developed ways to measure and quantify physical properties of dark energy and dark matter in the universe. Cooray is also a science editor of Journal of Cosmology and Astroparticle Physics (JCAP).

Education
Cooray attended Royal College, Colombo, Sri Lanka, for secondary education, Massachusetts Institute of Technology for undergraduate studies in physics and mathematics, and completed a PhD in astrophysics in 2001 at University of Chicago under Wayne Hu.

Career
He was the Sherman Fairchild Senior Research Fellow in theoretical astrophysics at California Institute of Technology between the years 2001 and 2005, funded by the Sherman Fairchild foundation. He was a recipient of an early career-development award (CAREER) from US National Science Foundation in 2007.

Publications
List of Publications

References

External links
Cooray's web site

Living people
Sinhalese academics
California Institute of Technology faculty
Massachusetts Institute of Technology School of Science alumni
University of Chicago alumni
Alumni of Royal College, Colombo
1973 births
University of California, Irvine faculty